Maitland is an English and Scottish surname. 

Maitland may also refer to:

Places
Maitland, New South Wales, Australia
Maitland, South Australia, Australia
Lake Maitland, a dry lake in Western Australia, Australia
Maitland Volcano, British Columbia, Canada
Maitland, Cape Town, South Africa
Maitland, Florida, U.S.
Maitland, Missouri, U.S.
Maitland, South Dakota, U.S.
Maitland, Hants County, Nova Scotia, Canada

Rivers
Maitland River (Western Australia)
Maitland River, Ontario, Canada
Maitland River (South Africa), a river in South Africa

Other uses 
 Clan Maitland, a Lowland Scottish clan
 , a ship and a shore base of the Royal Australian Navy
 Maitland, a building of Somerville College, Oxford
 Disappearance of Brianna Maitland, in 2004
 Maitland Ward, American actress and model

See also
 
 Maitland River (disambiguation)